The Kishau Dam is a proposed gravity dam on the Tons River which will straddle the border between the Indian states of Himachal Pradesh and Uttarakhand. The primary purpose of the dam is power generation and downstream water supply.

After years of negotiations over water-sharing between the two states, the dam is currently awaiting clearance from the Ministry of Environment and Forests. Construction was originally expected to begin in 2015. Approval was granted in 2018. Completion is slated for 2023.

See also

 Bhakra Dam
 Lakhwar Dam
 Renuka Dam

References

Dams in Uttarakhand
Dams in Himachal Pradesh
Proposed dams in India
Hydroelectric power stations in Uttarakhand
Hydroelectric power stations in Himachal Pradesh
Proposed hydroelectric power stations
Gravity dams